The Moder is a river in northeastern France; it begins in Zittersheim and ends at the river Rhine.

Etymology
The name of the river comes from Matrae—the Gallic river goddess.

Course
Its source of the Moder is near the hamlet Moderfeld, in the commune of Zittersheim. It joins the Rhine near the Iffezheim Lock, in Germany. The four primary tributaries of the Moder are the Zinsel du Nord, Zorn, Rothbach, and Soultzbach.

The river passes through the following communes:

References 

Rivers of France
Rivers of Grand Est
Rivers of Bas-Rhin
Tributaries of the Moder